608 may refer to:
the year 608 AD
Area code 608, located in Southwest Wisconsin
Peugeot 608, Peugeot's current executive car
Section 608 of the  U.S. Clean Air Act, which licenses HVAC technicians in the United States